PepsiCo has produced a number of variations on its primary cola, Pepsi, over the years, including the following:

Regular Varieties

North America

Europe

Japan
Pepsi Carnival: A tropical fruit-flavored Pepsi available in Japan for a limited time that debuted in summer 2006. The same concept was later released as Pepsi Summer Mix in 2007 in the US, although the formula was most likely different.
Pepsi Red and Gold: Released alongside each other in November 2006, Red had a ginger flavor that was somewhat spicy, while Gold's flavor was more a mild ginger taste.
Pepsi Ice Cucumber: Limited edition green, cucumber-flavored Pepsi sold in summer 2007.
Pepsi Blue Hawaii: A summer 2008 limited edition, pineapple and lemon-flavored Pepsi, blue in color.
Pepsi White: Limited edition Pepsi with yogurt flavor, sold in winter 2008. It was released again for a limited time in winter 2012 with a mandarin orange flavor. Another variant called White Cola Pepsi was released in 2015, with a light citrus flavor similar to the2012 version.Pepsi Shiso: Limited edition green shiso-flavored soda sold during summer 2009.Pepsi Azuki: An azuki bean-flavored limited edition Pepsi released on October 20, 2009.Pepsi Baobab: A baobab tree fruit-flavored, limited edition Pepsi released on May 25, 2010.Pepsi Strong Shot: A limited edition Pepsi released in 2010 with a high concentration of caffeine and extra carbonation. Followed up on in 2015 with Pepsi Strong and Pepsi Strong Zero. These were sold in larger sizes and with an even higher concentration of caffeine and carbonation. This was further followed up on in May 2016 with Pepsi Strong 5.0 GV, a soda so carbonated that a new bottle had to be designed to contain it.Pepsi Mont Blanc: a Limited edition Pepsi based on the French chestnut dessert. Sold for a limited time from October 2010.Pepsi Dry: Limited edition non-sweet (but not completely sugar-free) Bitter Pepsi variant released by Suntory on May 24, 2011.Pepsi Caribbean Gold: A limited edition, golden-colored, white sapote fruit-flavored Pepsi released on July 26, 2011.Pepsi Pink: Limited edition pink, strawberry milk-flavored Pepsi released on November 8, 2011 for a limited time. It was released again in 2014.Pepsi Black: A soda similar to Pepsi Dry, with 50% less sugar than regular Pepsi, and blacker in color, released in Summer 2012, by Suntory.Pepsi Extra: A caffeinated variant of Pepsi sold in 200 ml cans in summer 2012. Pepsi Salty Watermelon: A watermelon flavored Pepsi, sold in Japan in June 2012 for a limited time only.Pepsi Special: Has ingredient to limit absorption of fat. Sold in June 2012.Pepsi Special Lemon Mint: A limited edition Pepsi released in the summer of 2015. It was a zero calorie soda touted to meet the Food for Specified Health Uses (FOSHU) standards.Pepsi Ghost: Released on October 6, 2015. The bottles featured Halloween themed labels, while the flavor was an unidentified mystery flavor.Pepsi Sakura: A floral cherry blossom flavored Pepsi, released on March 2016.
 Pepsi Orange: Orange flavour Pepsi Edition from 2020.Pepsi Christmas Cola: A limited edition, Christmas themed Pepsi released November 21, 2017. While not cake batter flavored, the creamy white cola and strawberry combination are reminiscent of the whipped cream and strawberries of a traditional Japanese Christmas cake.Pepsi Halloween Cola: Released in October 2017, this "mystery" flavor was pink, with a sweet cherry and bubblegum flavor. It also somewhat resembled past Sakura flavored Pepsi.Pepsi Caramel Punch: A limited edition caramel-flavored Pepsi, released on October 20, 2020.

ChinaPepsi Sweet Osmanthus: Pepsi with sweet osmanthus flowers flavoring launched in 2020.Pepsi White Peach and Oolong: Pepsi with white peach and Oolong tea flavoring launched in 2021.Pepsi Banpeiyu and Green Bamboo: Pepsi with banpeiyu and bamboo flavoring launched in 2022.

Latin AmericaPepsi Limón: Pepsi with lime flavor released in Mexico in 2002, later returns as Pepsi Twist in 2004, no longer produced.Pepsi Twistão Sold during summertime in Brazil, it is a Pepsi with a lemon flavor stronger than regular Pepsi Twist. "Twistão", in Portuguese, is the augmentative of "Twist".Pepsi Capuchino a blend of cola with mocha-latte coffee flavor. Released for a limited time in Guatemala and El Salvador in 2006 in  bottles. Later introduced in Honduras in 2012.Pepsi Retro (rendered in written advertisement as PEPSI retro): Released in Mexico in February 2008. Pepsi made with natural ingredients, sugar cane, and cola nut extract.Pecsi: Pepsi spelled differently as "Pecsi," made in Argentina in 2009 and Mexico in 2011.Pepsi Kaffe one of a number of coffee-flavored Pepsi variants introduced outside the US in the 2000s

Other marketsPepsi Blue Chilled Cola, or simply Pepsi Blue, which was promoted by Britney Spears was released in Vietnam. Another version of Pepsi, Pepsi Ice Mint flavored Pepsi sold for a limited time along with Pepsi Fire in south east Asia including Malaysia.Pepsi Cheer, a sweet syrup tasting style of Pepsi sold in Thailand in 2010.Pepsi Fire: a limited edition, cinnamon-flavored variety that is sold in Guam, Saipan, Thailand, Mexico, Malaysia, Singapore, the Philippines, and Vietnam. It is also a Pepsi Ice twin version.Pepsi Green: a bright-green variety introduced in Thailand on January 15, 2009.Pepsi Creaming Soda : A strong cream and vanilla light pepsi tasting soda. Giving out an ice cream milkshake like flavor. Available in Australia & New Zealand. Pepsi Ice: Pepsi with an icy mint flavor. Sold in Guam, Thailand, Malaysia, Singapore, and the Philippines. In summer 2007 Pepsi used the name Pepsi Ice in the Czech Republic and Slovakia for a limited edition cola with apple flavor. Pepsi Light: sold in Australia and New Zealand for short time. Pepsi Aha: Lemon-flavored Pepsi sold in IndiaPepsi Pinas: Pepsi Blue renamed sold in PhilippinesPepsi Pogi: Sold only in PhilippinesPepsi Mango:Available both in Australia & New Zealand since 2021.Pepsi Latte: Sold in ThailandPepsi Tarik: Coffee-flavored, sold in Malaysia and Singapore

Low-Calorie Varieties 
Diet Pepsi/Pepsi Light

Pepsi Max

Other Low-Calorie Varieties

Fictional drinksPepsi Perfect': A vitamin-enriched Pepsi variation shown in the movie Back to the Future Part II'' in scenes set in the year 2015.

References

External links
Pepsi Web Site's list of U.S. types

 Pepsi
Pepsi
Pepsi types
Pepsi
Pepsi